Anthony Pohlmann was a Hanoverian soldier who served in the armies of the British East India Company and Daulat Scindia.

Life
Pohlmann arrived in India as a sergeant in a Hanoverian regiment serving the East India Company in Madras. He deserted his regiment in 1792 or 1793 and took employment in the army of the Maratha prince Daulat Scindia.

He served under the French mercenary Benoît de Boigne, who promoted him to captain in 1794. By 1795, he was in command of a battalion of infantry, serving alongside the Anglo-Indian military adventurer James Skinner. In early 1799, Pierre Cuillier-Perron – who superseded de Boigne as the overall commander of Scindia's troops – promoted Pohlmann to colonel and gave him command of Scindia's second brigade. Pohlmann was instrumental at defeating the Rajput armies of Jodhpur and Jaipur at the Battle of Malpura. At the Battle of Assaye in 1803, Pohlmann effectively commanded all the regular battalions in the Maratha army, after Scindia and the Rajah of Berar absented themselves before the battle. He re-entered service with the East India Company as a lieutenant colonel in 1804.

Fiction
Anthony Pohlmann is a significant character in Bernard Cornwell's historical novels Sharpe's Triumph and Sharpe's Trafalgar.

References

Military personnel from Hanover
German mercenaries
British East India Company Army officers
Year of birth unknown
Year of death unknown
People of the Second Anglo-Maratha War
Mercenaries in India
18th-century births
19th-century deaths